Alan Michael Heflin (October 1, 1939 - September 7, 2015) was an American Democratic politician from Mississippi. He was a member of the Mississippi State Senate from 1984 to 1992.

Early life 
Alan Michael Heflin was born on October 1, 1939, in Birmingham, Alabama. He was the son of Ralph and Mildred Heflin. Alan graduated from John Carroll Catholic High School in 1957. Heflin then attended Saint Mary's College and Saint Bernard's College and received a degree in philosophy from the latter. After graduating, Heflin worked at Campbell's Soup Company in Birmingham, Alabama. He moved with his family to Forest, Mississippi, in 1968.

Political career 
From 1984 to 1988, Heflin represented the 31st district as a Democrat in the Mississippi State Senate. He was re-elected and also served from 1988 to 1992. While in the Senate, Heflin was the chairman of the Senate's Fees, Salaries, and Administration Committee.

Later life 
Heflin died on September 7, 2015, in Morton, Mississippi.

References 

1939 births
2015 deaths
Democratic Party Mississippi state senators
People from Forest, Mississippi
People from Birmingham, Alabama
20th-century American politicians